Hits is a 2011 compilation album by Australian recording artist Kylie Minogue. It was released solely in Japan, Hong Kong, Thailand and the Philippines by EMI. The compilation contains songs from Light Years (2000), Fever (2001), Body Language (2003), Ultimate Kylie (2004), Showgirl Homecoming Live (2007), X (2007) and Aphrodite (2010), in addition to a remix of "Get Outta My Way" by Japanese electronic musician Yasutaka Nakata of Capsule. A special edition was also released, including a bonus DVD of music videos.

Track listing

Charts

Release history

References

2011 greatest hits albums
Albums produced by Cutfather
Albums produced by Greg Kurstin
Albums produced by Stock Aitken Waterman
Albums produced by Stuart Price
EMI Records compilation albums
Kylie Minogue compilation albums
Contemporary R&B compilation albums
Disco compilation albums
Electropop compilation albums
House music compilation albums
Albums produced by Richard Stannard (songwriter)